The term Eparchy of Western America or Diocese of Western America may refer to:

 Serbian Orthodox Eparchy of Western America, an eparchy (diocese) of the Serbian Orthodox Church
 Russian Orthodox Eparchy of Western America and San Francisco, an eparchy (diocese) of the Russian Orthodox Church Outside Russia
 Armenian Eparchy of Western America, an eparchy (diocese) of the Armenian Apostolic Church, under the Holy See of Cilicia
 Assyrian Eparchy of Western America, an eparchy (diocese) of the Assyrian Church of the East

See also
Christianity in the United States
Eparchy of Eastern America (disambiguation)
Eparchy of Canada (disambiguation)